Tuxissa is a fictional computer virus hoax made up by Humorix, a humor website on Linux.

Although the website states  that all articles there are fake, anti-virus software makers such as Symantec, Sophos and F-Secure had pages for the Tuxissa virus hoax.

Hoax 

The virus is based on the Melissa virus, with its aim to install Linux onto the victim's computer without the owner's notice. It is spread via e-mail, contained within a message titled "Important Message About Windows Security". It first spreads the virus to other computers, then it downloads a stripped-down version of Slackware, and uncompresses it onto the hard disk. The Windows Registry is finally deleted, and the boot options changed. There the virus destroys itself when it reboots the computer at the end, with the user facing the Linux login prompt.

See also
List of computer virus hoaxes

Footnotes

External links
Symantec's security response to the virus
Sophos' virus info on Tuxissa
Humorix's article, where the joke first started
F-Secure anti-virus software program's page about the Tuxissa virus

Virus hoaxes
Fictional computer viruses